Gupta is a common surname or last name of Indian origin. It is based on the Sanskrit word गोप्तृ goptṛ, which means 'guardian' or 'protector'. According to historian R. C. Majumdar, the surname Gupta was adopted by several different communities in northern and eastern India at different times.

In Bengal 
The Rāmpāl plate of Srichandra mentions a line of Brahmins who had Gupta as their surname. In Bengal region, the surname is found among Baidyas (mainly) as well as Kayasthas.

In Northern India 
The Gupta surname is also used by Banias and Jains in the northern part of India.

Notables

Monarchs 
Gupta (king), founder of the Gupta dynasty
Ghatotkacha (king)
Chandragupta I
Samudragupta
Chandragupta II, also known as Chandragupta Vikramaditya
Kumaragupta I
Skandagupta, last Gupta emperor
Vishnugupta (Gupta Empire)
Budhagupta

Academic 
Akhil Gupta (born 1959), professor at the University of California, Los Angeles, in the field of social and cultural anthropology
Amar Gupta, professor and scientist
Amlan Das Gupta, Indian professor of English in Jadavpur University, Kolkata
Anil Kumar Gupta, Delhi based professor and policy expert on environment, climate change and disasters
Arvind Gupta (born 1961), 13th President of the University of British Columbia
Arvind Gupta, Indian toy inventor and popularizer of science
Brahmagupta, Indian mathematician and astronomer
Deepak Gupta, Indian researcher, software developer, and writer
Devendra Prasad Gupta (1933 – 2017), Indian academician and a former vice chancellor of Ranchi University
M. G. Gupta, Urdu poet and research scholar
Mrinal Kumar Das Gupta (1923 – 2005), Indian professor and scientist
Modadugu Vijay Gupta  (born 1939), Indian biologist
Narmada Prasad Gupta
Neena Gupta, Indian mathematician
S. P. Gupta, Indian archaeologist and art historian
Suraj N. Gupta, Indian-American physicist
Taruna Madan Gupta, Indian Clinical pharmaceutical scientist

In business and management
Ajit Gupta, Founder of Aryaka
Anant Gupta, Former CEO and President of HCL Technologies
Anil Rai Gupta, chairman and CEO of Havells
Desh Bandhu Gupta, was an Indian billionaire, philanthropist, entrepreneur and the founder of Lupin Limited
Gupta family, well known South African family with significant business interests whose most notable members are the brothers Ajay, Atul and Rajesh Gupta
Himanshu Gupta, co-founder and CEO of ClimateAI
Mahendra Mohan Gupta, owner of the Dainik Jagran group of Hindi newspapers
Naren Gupta (1948–2021), Indian-American entrepreneur
Nilesh Gupta, Indian businessman, managing director of Lupin Limited
Piyush Gupta, CEO and Director of DBS Group
Radhika Gupta, CEO of Edelweiss Group
Raj Gupta, CEO and president of Rohm and Haas
Rajat Gupta, United Nations special advisor on management reforms, former director of Goldman Sachs and former head of McKinsey & Company
Rajinder Gupta , Chairman of Trident Group 
Rajiv Gupta (technocrat), general manager of Hewlett Packard's E-speak project
S. K. Gupta, vice president of the Lockheed Martin Corporation
Sanjay Gupta (businessman), Indian civil servant
Sanjay Gupta (business executive), country manager and vice president (sales and operations) of Google India
Sanjeev Gupta, Founder of Liberty House Group
Shravan Gupta, Chairman of MGF Group, previously a director at Emaar MGF Land
Umang Gupta, Indian-American entrepreneur
Vikas Gupta (businessman), Indian American internet entrepreneur, founded Jambool, an online company that was acquired by Google
Vinita Gupta (born 1950), Indian-American businesswoman and founder of Digital Link Corporation (now Quick Eagle Networks)
Vinita D. Gupta (born 1968/1969), Indian-American businesswoman and CEO of Lupin
Vinod Gupta, chairman and CEO of infoUSA
Vivek Gupta (business executive), President and CEO (Chief Executive Officer), and Director on the Board of Mastech Digital

In entertainment
Additi Gupta, Indian television actress
Ankit Gupta, Indian television actor
Aakash Gupta, Indian comedian 
Appurv Gupta, Indian comedian
Amrapali Gupta, Indian television actress
Anil Gupta, British writer and producer (radio and television)
Buddhadev Das Gupta, Indian classical sarod musician and teacher
Kovid Gupta, Indian-American author, screenwriter, filmmaker, and social activist
Megha Gupta, Indian television actress
Neena Gupta, Indian film and television actress
Rajendra Gupta, actor in cinema for good character roles.
Partho Sen-Gupta, Indian film director and script writer
Rohit Gupta, American Film director
Puja Gupta, winner of Miss India Universe in 2007
Tanika Gupta, British playwright of Indian origin
Sanjay Gupta, Bollywood director
Yana Gupta, Indian model-actress of Czech origin
Sanjay Gupta, American teleneurosurgeon and CNN senior medical correspondent
Esha Gupta, Femina Miss India International title in 2007, Indian film actress 
Aarti Gupta, winner of Miss Teen India International 2014, Indian-American model
Vikas Gupta, Indian television producer, director and host
Manish Gupta, Indian film director
Yana Gupta, Czech actress, model

In fiction
Nina Gupta (EastEnders), fictional character from the British soap opera EastEnders

In journalism
Shekhar Gupta, former editor-in-chief of Indian Express

In law
Deepak Gupta, a judge of the Supreme Court of India and former Chief Justice of the Tripura and the Chhattisgarh High Courts
Rajiv Gupta, former Chief Justice of Chhattisgarh, Uttarakhand and Kerala High Courts
Vanita Gupta, former head of the Civil Rights Division at the United States Department of Justice

In literature
Maithili Sharan Gupt, Indian Hindi poet
Baldev Raj Gupta, Indian writer
Ishwar Chandra Gupta, Indian Bengali poet and writer
Jagadish Gupta, Bengali poet and writer
Mahendranath Gupta, Indian spiritual writer and disciple of Ramakrishna Paramahamsa
 Subhadra Sen Gupta, a historical children's writer

In politics
Banarsi Das Gupta, former Chief Minister of Haryana
Chandra Bhanu Gupta, served three terms as Chief Minister of Uttar Pradesh
Ram Prakash Gupta, former Chief Minister of Uttar Pradesh and Governor of Madhya Pradesh
Indrajit Gupta, Indian communist leader, Union Minister for Home Affairs during 1996-98
Asim Dasgupta,  former Finance and Excise Minister of West Bengal
Shyama Charan Gupta, Indian politician
Badal Gupta, Indian revolutionary
Dinesh Gupta, Indian revolutionary
Ram Prakash Gupta, Indian social worker and participant in the Indian Independence movement and Bhoodan movement
Mahesh Chandra Gupta, Indian politician (MLA of Budaun)
Manmath Nath Gupta, Indian revolutionary and author of autobiographical, historical and fictional books in Hindi, English and Bengali
Manish Gupta, MP, Rajya Sabha and former MLA from Jadavpur, Kolkata, West Bengal
Niranjan Sen Gupta, Indian revolutionary
Nolini Kanta Gupta, Indian revolutionary, linguist, scholar, critic, poet, philosopher and mystic
Chaman Lal Gupta, Minister in the Vajpayee Government (BJP)
 Aayush kumar Gupta, Chairman & Central President of Samriddha Nepal Foundation , Youth Social Activist, Hindi Poet
Kavinder Gupta, former Deputy Chief Minister of Jammu and Kashmir

In sports
Abhinn Shyam Gupta, Indian badminton player
Pankaj Gupta, Indian sports administrators
Sandip Gupta, Kenyan cricketer
Abhijeet Gupta, Indian chess player
Deepdas Gupta, Former Indian Cricketer

In art
Janet Pancho Gupta, Filipino artist
Neeraj Gupta, Indian sculptor
Subodh Gupta, Indian artist
Rolf Gupta, Norwegian conductor
Masaba Gupta, Indian Fashion designer

References

Indian surnames
Bengali Hindu surnames
Gujarati-language surnames
Bania_communities